Brown Township is the name of two places in the U.S. state of Pennsylvania:
Brown Township, Lycoming County, Pennsylvania
Brown Township, Mifflin County, Pennsylvania

See also 
 Brownsville Township, Fayette County, Pennsylvania

Pennsylvania township disambiguation pages